The Jacquard machine is a device fitted to a loom that simplifies the process of manufacturing textiles with such complex patterns as brocade, damask and matelassé. The resulting ensemble of the loom and Jacquard machine is then called a Jacquard loom. The machine was patented by Joseph Marie Jacquard in 1804, based on earlier inventions by the Frenchmen Basile Bouchon (1725), Jean Baptiste Falcon (1728), and Jacques Vaucanson (1740). The machine was controlled by a "chain of cards"; a number of punched cards laced together into a continuous sequence. Multiple rows of holes were punched on each card, with one complete card corresponding to one row of the design. 

Both the Jacquard process and the necessary loom attachment are named after their inventor. This mechanism is probably one of the most important weaving innovations as Jacquard shedding made possible the automatic production of unlimited varieties of complex pattern weaving. The term "Jacquard" is not specific or limited to any particular loom, but rather refers to the added control mechanism that automates the patterning. The process can also be used for patterned knitwear and machine-knitted textiles such as jerseys.

This use of replaceable punched cards to control a sequence of operations is considered an important step in the history of computing hardware, having inspired Charles Babbage's Analytical Engine.

History
Traditionally, figured designs were made on a drawloom. The heddles with warp ends to be pulled up were manually selected by a second operator, the draw boy, not the weaver. The work was slow and labour-intensive, and the complexity of the pattern was limited by practical factor.
	
The first prototype of a Jacquard-type loom was made in the second half of the 15th century by an Italian weaver from Calabria, Jean le Calabrais, who was invited to Lyon by Louis XI. He introduced a new kind of machine which was able to work the yarns faster and more precisely. Over the years, improvements to the loom were ongoing.

An improvement of the draw loom took place in 1725, when Basile Bouchon introduced the principle of applying a perforated band of paper. A continuous roll of paper was punched by hand, in sections, each of which represented one lash or tread, and the length of the roll was determined by the number of shots in each repeat of pattern. The Jacquard machine then evolved from this approach.

Joseph Marie Jacquard saw that a mechanism could be developed for the production of sophisticated patterns. He possibly combined mechanical elements of other inventors, but certainly innovated. His machine was generally similar to Vaucanson's arrangement, but he made use of Jean-Baptiste Falcon's individual pasteboard cards and his square prism (or card "cylinder"): he is credited with having fully perforated each of its four sides, replacing Vaucanson's perforated "barrel". Jacquard's machine contained eight rows of needles and uprights, where Vaucanson had a double row. This modification enabled him to increase the figuring capacity of the machine. In his first machine, he supported the harness by knotted cords, which he elevated by a single trap board.

One of the chief advantages claimed for the Jacquard machine was that unlike previous damask-weaving machines, in which the figuring shed was usually drawn once for every four shots, with the new apparatus, it could be drawn on every shot, thus producing a fabric with greater definition of outline.

Jacquard's invention had a deep influence on Charles Babbage. In that respect, he is viewed by some authors as a precursor of modern computing technology.

Principles of operation

On the diagram, the cards are fastened into a continuous chain (1) which passes over a square box.  At each quarter rotation a new card is presented to the Jacquard head which represents one row (one "pick" of the shuttle carrying the weft). The box swings from the right to the position shown and presses against the control rods (2).  Where there is a hole the rod passes through the card and is unmoved whereas if the hole is not punched the rod is pushed to the left.  Each rod acts upon a hook (3).  When the rod is pushed in, the hook moves out of position to the left, a rod that is not pushed in leaves its hook in place.  A beam (4) then rises under the hooks and those hooks in the rest location are raised; the hooks that have been displaced are not moved by the beam.  Each hook can have multiple cords (5).  The cords pass through a guide(6) and are attached to their heddle (7) and a return weight (8).  The heddles raise the warp to create the shed through which the shuttle carrying the weft will pass.  A loom with a 400 hook head might have four threads connected to each hook, resulting in a fabric that is 1600 warp ends wide with four repeats of the weave going across.

The term "Jacquard loom" is somewhat inaccurate.  It is the "Jacquard head" that adapts to a great many dobby looms that allow the weaving machine to then create the intricate patterns often seen in Jacquard weaving.

Jacquard-driven looms, although relatively common in the textile industry, are not as ubiquitous as dobby looms which are usually faster and much cheaper to operate. However, dobby looms are not capable of producing so many different weaves from one warp.  Modern jacquard machines are controlled by computers in place of the original punched cards and can have thousands of hooks.

The threading of a Jacquard machine is so labor-intensive that many looms are threaded only once. Subsequent warps are then tied into the existing warp with the help of a knotting robot which ties each new thread on individually.  Even for a small loom with only a few thousand warp ends the process of re-threading can take days.

Mechanical Jacquard devices

Originally the Jacquard machines were mechanical, and the fabric design was stored in a series of punched cards which were joined to form a continuous chain. The Jacquards often were small and only independently controlled a relatively few warp ends. This required a number of repeats across the loom width. Larger capacity machines, or the use of multiple machines, allowed greater control, with fewer repeats, and hence larger designs could be woven across the loom width.

A factory must choose looms and shedding mechanisms to suit its commercial requirements. As a rule the more warp control required the greater the expense. So it is not economical to purchase Jacquard machines if one can make do with a dobby mechanism. As well as the capital expense, the Jacquard machines are more costly to maintain as they are complex and require higher skilled personnel; an expensive design system is required to prepare the designs for the loom, and possibly a card-cutting machine. Weaving is more costly since Jacquard mechanisms are more likely to produce faults than dobby or cam shedding. Also, the looms will not run as quickly and down-time will increase because it takes time to change the continuous chain of cards when a design changes. For these reasons it is best to weave larger batches with mechanical Jacquards.

Electronic Jacquard machines

It is recorded that in 1855, a Frenchman adapted the Jacquard mechanism to a system by which it could be worked by electro-magnets. There was significant interest, but trials were not successful, and the development was soon forgotten.

Bonas Textile Machinery NV launched the first successful electronic Jacquard at ITMA Milan in 1983. Although the machines were initially small, modern technology has allowed Jacquard machine capacity to increase significantly, and single end warp control can extend to more than 10,000 warp ends. That avoids the need for repeats and symmetrical designs and allows almost infinite versatility. The computer-controlled machines significantly reduce the down time associated with changing punched paper designs, thus allowing smaller batch sizes. However, electronic Jacquards are costly and may not be required in a factory weaving large batch sizes, and smaller designs. The larger machines allowing single end warp control are very expensive, and can only be justified where great versatility is required, or very specialized design requirements need to be met. For example, they are an ideal tool to increase the ability and stretch the versatility of the niche linen Jacquard weavers who remain active in Europe and the West, while most of the large batch commodity weaving has moved to low cost areas.

Linen products associated with Jacquard weaving are linen damask napery, Jacquard apparel fabrics and damask bed linen. Jacquard weaving uses all sorts of fibers and blends of fibers, and it is used in the production of fabrics for many end uses. Jacquard weaving can also be used to create fabrics that have a Matelassé or a brocade pattern. Research is under way to develop layered and shaped items as reinforcing components for structures made from composite materials.

The woven silk prayer book 

A pinnacle of production using a Jacquard machine is a prayer book, woven in silk. All 58 pages of the prayer book were made of silk, woven using a Jacquard machine, using black and gray thread. The pages have elaborate borders with text and pictures of saints. It is estimated that 200,000 to 500,000 punch cards were necessary to encode the pages, at 160 threads per cm (400 threads per inch).

It was issued in 1886 and 1887, in Lyon, France. It was publicly displayed at the 1889 Exposition Universelle (World's Fair). It was designed by R.P.J. Hervier, woven by J.A. Henry and published by A. Roux.  It took 2 years and almost 50 trials to get correct. An estimated 50 or 60 copies were produced.

Importance in computing
The Jacquard head used replaceable punched cards to control a sequence of operations. It is considered an important step in the history of computing hardware.  The ability to change the pattern of the loom's weave by simply changing cards was an important conceptual precursor to the development of computer programming and data entry. Charles Babbage knew of Jacquard machines and planned to use cards to store programs in his Analytical Engine. In the late 19th century, Herman Hollerith took the idea of using punched cards to store information a step further when he created a punched card tabulating machine which he used to input data for the 1890 U.S. Census. A large data processing industry using punched-card technology was developed in the first half of the twentieth centurydominated initially by the International Business Machine corporation (IBM) with its line of unit record equipment. The cards were used for data, however, with programming done by plugboards.

Some early computers, such as the 1944 IBM Automatic Sequence Controlled Calculator (Harvard Mark I) received program instructions from a paper tape punched with holes, similar to Jacquard's string of cards. Later computers executed programs from higher-speed memory, though cards were commonly used to load the programs into memory. Punched cards remained in use in computing up until the mid-1980s.

Examples

See also
 Thomas Ferguson & Co Ltd, Jacquard weaver
 Dobby loom

Notes

References

Sources

External links

Posselt, Emanuel A. (1892) The Jacquard machine analyzed and explained: the preparation of Jacquard cards and practical hints to learners of Jacquard designing – digital facsimile from the Linda Hall Library
 CEMATEX, European Committee of Textile Machinery Manufacturers (and owners of the ITMA exhibition).

Weaving
Textile machinery
History of technology
Weaving equipment
1804 introductions
French inventions